The 1944 All-Southwest Conference football team consists of American football players chosen by various organizations for All-Southwest Conference teams for the 1944 college football season.  The selectors for the 1944 season included the Associated Press (AP) and the United Press (UP).

All Southwest selections

Backs
 Bobby Layne, Texas (AP-1)
 George Walmsley, Rice (AP-1)
 Norman Cox, Texas Christian (AP-1)
 Paul Yates, Texas A&M (AP-1)

Ends
 Mike Schumchyk, Arkansas (AP-1)
 Hubert Bechtol, Texas (AP-1)

Tackles
 Clyde Flowers, Texas Christian (AP-1)
 Monte Moncrief, Texas A&M (AP-1)

Guards
 H. J. Nichols, Rice (AP-1)
 Jack Sachse, Texas (AP-1)

Centers
 Jim Cooper, Texas Christian (AP-1)

Key
AP = Associated Press

UP = United Press

Bold = Consensus first-team selection of both the AP and UP

See also
1944 College Football All-America Team

References

All-Southwest Conference
All-Southwest Conference football teams